Cwm Cadlan is a Site of Special Scientific Interest in Glamorgan, south Wales. It is made up of a series of wet grassland fields in a small valley to the north west of Merthyr Tydfil. It is also designated as a Special Area of Conservation (SAC) and a National Nature Reserve (NNR).

See also
List of Sites of Special Scientific Interest in Mid & South Glamorgan

References

External links

Sites of Special Scientific Interest in Mid & South Glamorgan